Weller Township may refer to the following townships in the United States:

 Weller Township, Henry County, Illinois
 Weller Township, Richland County, Ohio